Pratap Singh Bhagel was an Indian politician. He was elected to the lower House of Parliament the Lok Sabha from Dhar, Madhya Pradesh  as a member of the Indian National Congress.

References

External links
 Official biographical sketch in Parliament of India website

India MPs 1984–1989
Indian National Congress politicians
1946 births
2017 deaths
Indian National Congress politicians from Madhya Pradesh